Capys penningtoni, the Pennington's protea, is a species of butterfly in the family Lycaenidae. It is endemic to South Africa, where it is restricted to the KwaZulu-Natal Drakensberg foothills.

The wingspan is 32–40 mm for males and 34–47 mm for females. Adults are on wing from mid-September to early November. There is one generation per year.

The larvae feed on the flower buds of Protea caffra and Protea simplex.

References

External links

Capys (butterfly)
Butterflies described in 1932
Butterflies of Africa
Taxa named by Norman Denbigh Riley
Taxonomy articles created by Polbot